The 1999 Southern Conference men's basketball tournament took place from February 25–28, 1999, at the Greensboro Coliseum in Greensboro, North Carolina. The College of Charleston Cougars, led by head coach John Kresse, won their first Southern Conference title and received the automatic berth to the 1999 NCAA tournament.

Format
All twelve teams were eligible for the tournament. The tournament used a preset bracket consisting of four rounds, the first of which featured four games, with the winners moving on to the quarterfinal round. The top two finishers in each division received first round byes.

Bracket

* Overtime game

See also
List of Southern Conference men's basketball champions

References

Tournament
Southern Conference men's basketball tournament
Southern Conference men's basketball tournament
Southern Conference men's basketball tournament
Basketball competitions in Greensboro, North Carolina
College sports tournaments in North Carolina
College basketball in North Carolina